The Master of Tai Chi (Traditional Chinese: 太極) is a Hong Kong martial arts television drama that aired on Jade and HD Jade from 25 February to 28 March 2008. Produced by Tommy Leung and Raymond Chai, The Master of Tai Chi is a TVB production. The drama was filmed in early 2006, and is the station's first high-definition series that was ever produced.

This is TVB's custom-made series for kung-fu icon Vincent Zhao. At the request of Zhao, the main character's name has been changed from 'Wen Zhiu' to 'Mo Ma'.

Synopsis 
It demonstrates the philosophy of the way,
It shows the path to wisdom and harmony,
A master is here to teach the essence of Tai Chi!

Orphaned as a child, Mo Ma (Vincent Zhao) grew up in the country and started learning Tai Chi from his mentor at a very young age. The devastating experience of being abandoned by his mother and eventually his mentor as well has left him twisted and full of hatred. After a series of events that leads to his house being burnt down in the village, his best friend Mai Fung-Nin (Kenneth Ma) and him joins the army. After yet another series of events, they saved Yin Chi-Kwai (Myolie Wu) and Yin Chui-Kiu (Selena Li) and travelled to the capital together. In the capital, another series of events leads Mo Ma to be reunited to his mentor and he starts learning Tai Chi from his mentor seriously.

Throughout the series, Mo Ma and his friends will experience many injustice that is planned by the Mayor's Assistant and the Head Police Officer aided by Lui Yau-Ngo (Derek Kok). The relationships of each character in the series will change and evolve as well especially between Mou Ma and Song Ching (Melissa Ng), Mai Fung-Nin and Yin Chui-Kiu and lastly between Yin Chi-Kwai and Tuen Hiu-Sing (Raymond Lam), Mo Ma's rival.

Cast

Viewership ratings

Awards and nominations
41st TVB Anniversary Awards (2008)
 "Best Drama"
 "Best Actor in a Supporting Role" (Kenneth Ma - Mai Fung-Nin)

References

External links 
TVB.com The Master of Tai Chi - Official Website 
K for TVB.net The Master of Tai Chi - Episodic Synopsis and Screen Captures 

TVB dramas
Martial arts television series
2008 Hong Kong television series debuts
2008 Hong Kong television series endings